The Beatson West of Scotland Cancer Centre (BWSCC; formerly called the Beatson Oncology Centre) is a specialised cancer care centre in Glasgow, Scotland.  Until recently it had facilities in Gartnavel General Hospital, the Western Infirmary and Glasgow Royal Infirmary. As part of the NHS Greater Glasgow and Clyde Acute Services Review, the centre is being centralised within new facilities at the Gartnavel General Hospital site.

History
The Glasgow Cancer and Skin Institution, which had been founded at 400 St Vincent Street in 1886, acquired a house at 163 Hill Street in 1890. A ten-bed hospital was established to treat cancer patients. In 1893, Dr. George Beatson (who as Sir George Beatson KCB, KBE later served as President of the Scottish Red Cross Society), was appointed surgeon to the hospital. The following year, the Glasgow Cancer Hospital, the first of its kind in Scotland, was established, together with an outdoor dispensary, at 22 West Graham Street. A domiciliary nursing service was set up at the same time to care for cancer patients in their own homes.

In 1896 new premises, which could accommodate 30 beds, were acquired at 132 Hill Street. In the same year Beatson published his landmark paper in The Lancet, a report of three patients with breast cancer whom he had treated by bilateral oophorectomy. This work forms the basis of the current anti-hormonal treatment of breast cancer and the operation is still performed today. In 1912, HRH Princess Louise, Duchess of Argyll, opened the rebuilt facilities which were named the Royal Glasgow Cancer Hospital. In the same year a research department was founded and the first director of research (Dr. Charles Walker) was appointed, making the institute one of the oldest "Comprehensive Cancer Centers" in the world.

With the inception of the Scottish National Health Service (NHS) in 1948, the hospital came under control of the Western Board of Management, and was renamed the Royal Beatson Memorial Hospital in 1953. In 1967, the Research Laboratories were renamed the Beatson Institute for Cancer Research, which continued to occupy the upper floors of the hospital until 1977, when they moved to a new site at Garscube Estate (renamed the Beatson Institute for Cancer Research in 2013). The clinical section moved to a new centre within the Western Infirmary and was named the Beatson Oncology Centre.

In 2007, the Beatson Oncology Centre, which was by that time spread over four hospitals (Western Infirmary, Gartnavel General Hospital, Glasgow Royal Infirmary and Stobhill Hospital) moved to a newly built Cancer Hospital, The Beatson West of Scotland Cancer Centre.

Support

The BWSCC was supported by charities Friends of the Beatson and The Beatson Oncology Centre Fund. In 2014 through a restructuring, and in partnership with NHS Greater Glasgow and Clyde, the resources of both charities dedicated to supporting the Beatson West of Scotland Cancer Centre have combined to form a unitary charity to support and serve the Beatson. The charity is named Beatson Cancer Charity.

Notable present or former physicians
Notable present or former physicians include:
Colonel Sir George Beatson, KCB, KBE, DL
Professor Sir Kenneth Calman, KCB, DL, FRSE
Professor Gordon McVie
Professor David Kerr, CBE
Professor Ann Barrett, OBE.
Dr Hosney Yosef, OBE

Notable present or former scientists
Notable present or former scientists include:
Lord Fleck, KBE, FRS
Air Marshal Sir Harold Whittingham, KCB, KBE
Professor Allan Balmain, FRS, FRSE
Professor Margaret Frame, OBE, FRSE
Professor Paul Workman, FRS
Professor Karen Vousden, CBE, FRS, FRSE

See also 
 Cancer in the United Kingdom

References

External links
 Beatson West of Scotland Cancer Centre
 Beatson Cancer Charity
 Beatson Institute

Hospitals in Glasgow
NHS Scotland hospitals
NHS Greater Glasgow and Clyde
1886 establishments in Scotland
Cancer organisations based in the United Kingdom
Hospitals established in 1886
Research organisations in Scotland